Thomas Brand may refer to:

Thomas Brand (minister) (1635–1691), English nonconformist
Thomas Brand (senior) (c. 1717–1770), British Member of Parliament for Gatton, New Shoreham, Okehampton and Tavistock
Thomas Brand Hollis (1719–1804), British radical and dissenter
Thomas Brand (junior) (1749–1794), British Member of Parliament for Arundel
Thomas Brand, 20th Baron Dacre (1774–1851), British Whig politician
Thomas Brand, 3rd Viscount Hampden (1869–1958), British peer
Thomas Brand, 4th Viscount Hampden (1900–1965), British peer
Thomas Brand, producer of Crazy People